Lohmiller is a surname of German origin. Notable people with the surname include:

 Charles B. Lohmiller (c.1867–1932), superintendent of the Fort Peck Indian Agency in Montana, US
 Chip Lohmiller (born 1966), former professional American football placekicker

References

See also 
 Lohmüller

Surnames of German origin